Pamela Howard Shriver (born July 4, 1962) is an American former professional tennis player and current tennis broadcaster, pundit, and coach. During the 1980s and 1990s, Shriver won 133 WTA Tour-level  titles, including 21 singles titles, 111 women's doubles titles, and one mixed doubles title. This includes 22 major titles, 21 in women's doubles and one in mixed doubles. Shriver also won an Olympic gold medal in women's doubles at the 1988 Seoul Olympics, partnering Zina Garrison. Shriver and regular doubles partner Martina Navratilova are the only women's pair to complete the Grand Slam in a calendar year, winning all four majors in 1984. She was ranked as high was world No. 3 in singles, and world No. 1 in doubles.

Playing style
Shriver was well known for her variety, including sharp volleys and all-round solid technique at the net. She also possessed a strong slice forehand and underspin approach, which set her apart from the rest of the women's field, but she had a comparatively weak chip backhand. She was known for being a serve-and-volleyer.

Career
Shriver first came to prominence at the 1978 US Open where, as a 16-year-old amateur, she reached the women's singles final. She defeated the reigning Wimbledon champion Martina Navratilova in a semifinal. Shriver then lost to Chris Evert in the final. This early singles achievement proved to be the pinnacle of her singles success. Shriver also won her first career singles title in 1978 in Columbus, Ohio and won a total of 21 singles titles between 1978 and 1997.

The 1978 US Open final was the only Grand Slam singles final of Shriver's career. She lost the next eight Grand Slam singles semifinals she played, four of them to Navratilova, two to Steffi Graf, and one each to Evert and Hana Mandlíková.

In 2022 Shriver disclosed that she had been in a multi-year inappropriate relationship with her coach, Australian Don Candy, that started when she was a teenager. She chose to reveal the story in part because of her concern that there are ongoing issues with young tennis players being placed in vulnerable situations.

Doubles
Shriver achieved numerous successes in doubles tournaments with Navratilova, winning 79 women's doubles titles. Shriver won 112 career doubles titles overall and is one of six female players in the Open era to have won more than 100 career titles.

Navratilova and Shriver formed one of the most successful women's doubles teams, capturing seven Australian Open, five Wimbledon, five US Open and four French Open titles. In 1984, the pair captured all four major women's doubles titles, i.e. the "Calendar Grand Slam." This was part of a record 109-match winning streak between 1983 and 1985. The pair were named the WTA Tour's "Doubles Team of the Year" eight consecutive times from 1981 through 1988 and won the WTA Tour Championships title ten times between 1981 and 1992.

Shriver won another women's doubles Grand Slam title at the US Open in 1991, partnering with Natasha Zvereva. She was also the 1987 French Open mixed doubles winner with Emilio Sánchez. She won all three gold medals (singles, women's doubles, and mixed doubles) at the 1991 Pan American Games in Havana, Cuba.

Shriver reached the world No. 1 doubles ranking in 1985 and held it briefly before relinquishing it again to Navratilova, her playing partner.

Federation Cup
In the Federation Cup representing the United States, Shriver won five out of five singles matches and 14 of 15 doubles matches. From 1986 to 1992, she played in 17 Federation Cup ties. She reached three finals with her compatriots, winning twice; in 1986 the U.S. defeated Czechoslovakia (3–0); in 1987 the U.S. lost to Germany (1–2); and in 1989 the U.S. defeated Spain (3–0).

Broadcaster
Shriver has provided television commentary for ABC, CBS, ESPN, and The Tennis Channel in the United States, the BBC in the United Kingdom, and the Seven Network in Australia. She has been providing coverage of various events since her 1996 retirement.

During Wimbledon 2010, James Blake admonished Shriver for criticizing him while his match was still in progress, as Shriver was in an outside commentary box and he could hear her. Shriver said she regretted responding to Blake while still on air.

Equipment
Shriver was one of the first players to use an oversized racquet, manufactured by Prince.

Distinctions and honors
 Throughout the 1980s, Shriver was ranked among the world's top 10 in women's singles, peaking at world No. 3.
 She was elected to serve as president of the WTA Tour Players Association from 1991 to 1994.
 She has served as president of the USA Tennis Foundation and on the board of directors of the United States Tennis Association.
 She was inducted into the International Tennis Hall of Fame in 2002.
 She was awarded the Ambassador Award of Excellence by the LA Sports & Entertainment Commission in 2002.

Personal life
Shriver was born in Baltimore, Maryland, to Sam and Margot Shriver. She first started playing tennis at the age of three. She graduated from McDonogh School in Owings Mills, Maryland. She is a minority owner of the Baltimore Orioles and is active in various charitable organizations. Her first husband, Joe Shapiro, a former Walt Disney Company lawyer, died of non-Hodgkin's lymphoma in 1999.

In 2002, Shriver married actor George Lazenby. She gave birth to their first child, George Junior, on July 12, 2004, and to twins Kate and Sam on October 1, 2005. The family lived in Brentwood, California. In August 2008, Shriver filed for divorce from Lazenby after six years of marriage. Their divorce was finalized in May 2011.

Shriver has two sisters—Marion, who died from cancer in 1997, and Eleanor who lives in Maryland. She is a fourth cousin of Maria Shriver, the former First Lady of California and niece of President John F. Kennedy.

Shriver is an ambassador for Up2Us Sports, a national non-profit organization dedicated to supporting underserved youth by providing them with coaches trained in positive youth development.

In 2021 Shriver became a supporter of the new Women's Sports Policy Working Group formed in response to President Joe Biden's executive order that mandates inclusiveness for transgender female athletes.

Grand Slam performance timelines

Singles

Doubles

References

External links
 
 
 
 
 Bio at AllAmericanSpeakers.com

1962 births
American female tennis players
Australian Open (tennis) champions
French Open champions
Hopman Cup competitors
International Tennis Hall of Fame inductees
Living people
Olympic gold medalists for the United States in tennis
Sportspeople from Baltimore
Shriver family
Tennis commentators
Tennis players from Los Angeles
Tennis people from Maryland
Tennis players at the 1988 Summer Olympics
Tennis players at the 1991 Pan American Games
US Open (tennis) champions
Wimbledon champions
Women sports announcers
Grand Slam (tennis) champions in women's doubles
Grand Slam (tennis) champions in mixed doubles
Medalists at the 1988 Summer Olympics
Maryland Republicans
California Republicans
People from Owings Mills, Maryland
Pan American Games gold medalists for the United States
Pan American Games medalists in tennis
Medalists at the 1991 Pan American Games
WTA number 1 ranked doubles tennis players